The Solid Fuels Administration for War (SFAW) was a U.S. federal agency that administered wartime government controls on solid fuels industries.

According to Executive Order 9332 Establishing the Solid Fuels Administration for War,
The term "solid fuels" includes all forms of anthracite, bituminous, sub-bituminous, and lignitic coals (including packaged and processed fuels, such as briquettes) ...

The term "solid fuels industries" means the development, production, preparation, treatment, processing, storage, shipment, receipt, and distribution of solid fuels within the United States, its territories and possessions, but does not include the transportation of solid fuels.

It also advised other agencies, such as the Office of Defense Transportation, the War Shipping Administration, and the War Manpower Commission concerning solid fuels production, pricing, transportation, and distribution. 

It operated government-seized coal mines, either directly or through cooperation with successive Coal Mines Administrations.

It was established within the Department of the Interior by EO 9332, April 19, 1943, replacing the Office of Solid Fuels Coordinator for War; and absorbing functions of the abolished Bituminous Coal Division, Department of the Interior, August 24, 1943.

It was abolished, effective June 30, 1947, by EO 9847, May 6, 1947.

See also 
Don Hilary Gingery

References 

1943 establishments in the United States
United States Department of the Interior agencies
Government agencies established in 1943
1947 disestablishments in the United States
Defunct agencies of the United States government
Coal mining in the United States
Government agencies disestablished in 1947